Rekoa palegon, the gold-bordered hairstreak, is a butterfly in the family Lycaenidae. It is found from Argentina north to Mexico and the West Indies. A raro stray has been recorded from southern Texas.

The wingspan is 23–28 mm. The upperside is dull brown and the underside is gray with orange-brown outer margins and irregular stripes. There is one generation per year with adults on wing in early November in southern Texas and from May to December in Mexico. They feed on the nectar from flowers of Senecio and Eupatorium species.

The larvae feed on a wide range of plants, including Asteraceae species.

References

Butterflies described in 1780
Eumaeini